The Oriskany Sandstone is a Middle Devonian age unit of sedimentary rock found in eastern North America.  The type locality of the unit is located at Oriskany Falls in New York.  The Oriskany Sandstone extends throughout much of the Appalachian Basin.

The unit name usage by the U.S. Geological Survey (USGS) is the Oriskany Sandstone. 
Butts (1940) stated that the Oriskany Sandstone "corresponds exactly with the Ridgely Sandstone" and that the rules of stratigraphic nomenclature dictate that the name Oriskany Sandstone should be applied to these strata.

Geographic extent
Appalachian Basin: New York, Pennsylvania, Ohio, West Virginia, Maryland, Virginia, Kentucky

Stratigraphic setting

Fossils

 List of fossiliferous stratigraphic units in West Virginia

Interpretation of depositional environment
shallow marine

Economic resources
Oil, gas, glass sand

References

Further reading 
 
 
 
 

Devonian West Virginia
Devonian geology of New York (state)
Devonian geology of Virginia
Eifelian Stage
Devonian southern paleotemperate deposits